Püdelsi is a Polish musical group founded in 1986 in Kraków.

The band's music became the continuation of the musical and lyrical heritage of the psychedelic art music group "Düpą", and its leader Piotr Marek, who committed suicide in 1985. The first release was the album Bela Pupa, where most of the songs were sung by Polish pop vocalist Kora (Olga Jackowska), except "Morrison" and "W krainie ciemności" that were sung by Püdelsi's later frontman and vocalist, Maciej Maleńczuk. After receiving practically no critical reception on their album, the band dissolved in the late 80's. After almost 5 years on hiatus, Püdelsi revived their activity, and started working on a new album. "Viribus Unitis", the band's second record, was released in 1996. The band was influenced by psychedelic rock, hard rock, reggae, and elements of metal music, and featured satirical, political and sometimes demonical lyrics. The newly taken musical direction was confirmed one year later, when Narodziny Zbigniewa was released. The material was recorded during the recording session of Viribus Unitis, but didn't make the final cut. Narodziny Zbigniewa is dedicated to Düpą's frontman Piotr Marek, and consists of his lyrics exclusively. In 1999 the album Psychopop was released. It consists mainly of songs with a more pop-psychedelic touch, which eventually embedded the band's place in Polish mainstream music. Püdelsi's fifth album, called Wolność słowa was released in 2003. In 2005 Maciej Maleńczuk left the band in order to evolve his solo career, as well as his career as the vocalist in the band Homo Twist. After finding a new singer, Szymon Goldberg, Püdelsi recorded and released their sixth album, Zen, in early 2007 and are currently working on some new material.

Discography

Studio albums

Compilation albums

References

External links
 

Polish alternative rock groups